DCI may be an abbreviation for:

Technology
 D-chiro-inositol, an isomer of inositol
 Data, context and interaction, an architectural pattern in computer software development
 Direct Count & Intersect, an algorithm for discovering frequent sets in large databases 
 Digitally controlled impedance, impedance control function in FPGA
 Display Control Interface, a standard developed by Microsoft and Intel using code from San Francisco Canyon Company for device drivers that control computer graphics cards
 Distributed Computing Infrastructure, a term used in grid computing referring to the combination of distributed computer resources
 Ductile cast iron, another name for ductile iron, a more flexible type of cast iron
 dCi (direct Common-rail Injection), Renault/Nissan's common rail fuel injection technology for diesel engines
 Data Center Interconnect, (DCI) is a network that connects two or more Data Centers together to transport traffic between them

Businesses
 Digital Cinema Initiatives, a joint venture between the major Hollywood studios to establish a specification for a standard digital cinema architecture
 Discovery Communications, an American global media and entertainment company
 Dynamic Cassette International, a Boston, Lincolnshire, UK company that produces products under the Jet Tec brand name
 DCI Cheese Company, a cheese manufacturer
 Dolphin Capital Investors, a real estate investment company focusing on the residential resort sector in emerging markets, and listed on the Alternative Investment Market (AIM) of the London Stock Exchange
 Diners Club International, a global charge card

Organizations 
 DCI (formerly known as Duelists' Convocation International), an organization that sanctioned official tournaments of Wizards of the Coast games, most notably Magic: The Gathering
 Defence for Children International, an independent non-governmental organisation that operates globally to promote and protect children's rights
 Dental Council of India, an organisation which regulates dental education in India
 Dialysis Clinic, Inc, a nonprofit medical organization headquartered in Nashville, Tennessee
 Drum Corps International, the nonprofit organization governing modern junior drum and bugle corps
 DCI Global Partnerships, the community and work associated with DCI Trust—a UK charity committed to mobilising Christian leaders, providing micro-loans for the economically poor, networking a global Christian constituency and giving to bless the poor of the earth
 Distressed Children & Infants International, a nonprofit organization serving disadvantaged children in South Asia

Other
 Dade Correctional Institution, a prison in Florida
 Development Cooperation Instrument
 Director of Central Intelligence, the former title of the head of the U.S. Intelligence Community and Central Intelligence Agency
 Detective chief inspector, a police rank in the United Kingdom
 Decompression illness, a medical condition brought on by rapid decompression
 Doctor of Creative Industries, a qualification awarded by Queensland University of Technology
 Defence Capabilities Initiative, a 1999 NATO plan to ensure the effectiveness of multinational operations with a focus on improving interoperability among Alliance forces
 DCI, the number 601 in Roman numerals
 District of Columbia International School, a charter school in the District of Columbia